Ulrich Molitor (also Molitoris) (c. 1442 – before 23 December 1507) was a lawyer who wrote a treatise in opposition to the recent witch-phobic efforts by Heinrich Kramer. Molitor's work, De Lamiis et Pythonicis Mulieribus, was first published in 1489, three years after the first edition of Kramer's work, Malleus Maleficarum, and both books were reprinted frequently throughout the 1490s. Moliter was likely to have personally witnessed the inquisitions led by Heinrick Kramer in the diocese of Brixen and the diocese of Constance.

Molitor's work is written in the form of a dialogue with Molitor's position that of a skeptic in opposition to a witch-phobic fanatic (likely meant to represent Kramer). A third figure, Archduke Sigismund, acts as a wise arbiter. Molitor's position is that of the ancient and long-held traditional Catholic law, the Canon Episcopi(906), that considered witchcraft an illusion. Molitor quotes the Bible, Church Fathers and poets and focusses on the devil's ability to deceive. Sigismund in the dialogue is quick to dismiss evidence that was produced through the use of torture: "For the fear of punishments incites men to say what is contrary to the nature of the facts". Sigismund had also experienced an inquisition led by Kramer in Innsbruck in 1485 and may have played a decisive role in shutting it down, thereby preventing seven accused women from being executed.

Citations

Editions
 Molitoris, Ulrich, Schriften, ed. Jörg Mauz SJ [Studien zur Kulturgeschichte 1) (Constance, 1997)
 Molitor, Ulrich, Von Unholden und Hexen, New edition, annotated and translated into modern German, UBooks 2008

Sources
 Ammann, Hartmann, Der Innsbrucker Hexenprozess von 1485, in: Ferdinandeum Zeitschrift III. Folge, 34. Heft, S. 31 ff. 
 Beyer, Jürgen, 'Molitor, Ulrich', in Enzyklopädie des Märchens. Handwörterbuch zur historischen und vergleichenden Erzählforschun, vol. 9 (Berlin & New York, 1997–99), col. 767-769
 Mauz, Jörg, Ulrich Molitoris. Ein süddeutscher Humanist und Rechtsgelehrter (Vienna, 1992)
Geiling, Jens and Gawron, Thomas: "Molitor, Ulrich" in: Lexikon zur Geschichte der Hexenverfolgung  historicum.net)

1440s births
1507 deaths
Critics of witch hunting
German male writers
Witchcraft in Germany